Eiichiro, Eiichirō, Eiichirou or Eiichiroh (written: ,  or ) is a masculine Japanese given name. Notable people with the name include:

Eiichiro Azuma, American historian
, Japanese scientist
, Japanese actor and television personality
, Japanese film director
, Japanese folklorist and ethnologist
, Japanese hammer thrower
, Japanese manga artist
, Japanese footballer
, Japanese politician

Japanese masculine given names